
Year 198 BC was a year of the pre-Julian Roman calendar. At the time it was known as the Year of the Consulship of Catus and Flamininus (or, less frequently, year 556 Ab urbe condita). The denomination 198 BC for this year has been used since the early medieval period, when the Anno Domini calendar era became the prevalent method in Europe for naming years.

Events 
 By place 

 Roman Republic 
 After his election to the consulship, Titus Quinctius Flamininus is chosen to replace Publius Sulpicius Galba Maximus as the leading Roman general in Macedonia. He then crosses into Macedonia with his army. Flamininus realizes that future peace depends on breaking the power of king Philip V of Macedon, not merely humbling him. He secures the backing of the Achaean League and then opens peace negotiations with Philip at Nicaea in Locris. Though peace proposals are submitted to the Roman Senate, the talks break down, and fighting resumes.
 Titus Quinctius Flamininus' forces manage to push Philip V out of most of Greece, except for a few fortresses. He then defeats Philip V in the Battle of the Aous, near modern Tepelenë in Albania.

 Seleucid Empire 
 The Battle of Panium is fought between Seleucid forces led by Antiochus III and Ptolemaic forces led by Scopas of Aetolia. The Seleucids win the battle which allows Antiochus III to obtain entire possession of Palestine and Coele-Syria from King Ptolemy V of Egypt. Though the Romans send ambassadors to Ptolemy V, they are unable to lend him any serious assistance against Antiochus III.
 In the resulting peace, Antiochus III agrees to give his daughter Cleopatra in marriage to Ptolemy V.

 China 
 Following the defeat of the Han at the hands of Modu Chanyu of the Xiongnu at Baideng in 200 BC, courtier Liu Jing (劉敬) is dispatched by Han emperor Gaozu for negotiations. The peace settlement eventually reached between the parties includes a Han princess given in marriage to the chanyu (called heqin 和親 or "harmonious kinship"); periodic tribute of silk, liquor and rice to the Xiongnu; equal status between the states; and the Great Wall as mutual border. This treaty sets the pattern for relations between the Han and the Xiongnu for some sixty years.

References